The Moths and Butterflies of Great Britain and Ireland (abbreviated to MBGBI or MOGBI) is a multi-volume reference work on the Lepidoptera of the British Isles.

The original publisher of this series was Curwen Books who published volumes 1 and 9. In 1983 Harley Books took over publishing the series. The earlier volumes were reprinted. From 1 April 2008 following the retirement of Annette and Basil Harley, Apollo Books acquired Harley Books. It was decided, that Apollo Books would continue and conclude the series with volume 5 on Tortricidae, volume 6 on Pyralidae and Pterophoridae, and volume 8 on Geometridae. At the same time they took over the remaining stock of the previous seven volumes of the series. From 1 January 2013, Apollo Books announced that all Harley Books titles and the majority of the Apollo Books titles, have been taken over by the Dutch publisher Brill Publishers. The change was necessary to ensure that the book series can continue to be published in the years ahead

Eleven volumes were originally planned in total. So far, volumes 1, 2, 3, 4, 5, 7, 9 and 10 have been published. Volumes 4, 5 and 7 were each split into two parts due to their size. Volume 5, the most recent, was published in September 2014.

Each volume has text, distribution maps, and illustrations of the moths it covers. When the series is complete, this will be the first time that all species of Lepidoptera recorded in Britain have been illustrated in a single reference work.

Volume 7 part 2 contains a 241-page Life History chart covering all British species.

The series volume by volume

Volume 1 (Micropterigidae to Heliozelidae)

 Editor: John Heath
 Associate Editors: A. Maitland Emmet, D. S. Fletcher, E. C. Pelham-Clinton and W. G. Tremewan
 Artists: Brian Hargreaves and Maureen Lane
 Hardback:  (Blackwell Scientific Publications and Curwen Books)  (Harley Books)
 Paperback: 
 Published in: 1976 by Blackwell Scientific Publications and Curwen Books, and reprinted in 1983 by Harley Books
 Introductory chapters: 1) Morphology, 2) Parasites 3) Diseases 4) Pest Species 5) Habitats 6) Conservation 7) Techniques
 Covers Micropterigidae, Eriocraniidae, Hepialidae, Nepticulidae, Opostegidae, Tischeriidae, Incurvariidae and Heliozelidae

Volume 2 (Cossidae to Heliodinidae)

 Editor: John Heath and A. Maitland Emmet
 Associate Editors: D. S. Fletcher, E. C. Pelham-Clinton and B. Skinner and W. G. Tremewan
 Artists: Brian Hargreaves, Timothy Freed and Brenda Jarman
 Hardback: 
 Paperback: 
 Published in: 1985 by Harley Books
 Introductory chapter: British Aposematic Lepidoptera by Miriam Rothschild
 Covers the fifteen families within the super-families Cossoidea, Zygaenoidea, Tineoidea and the first part of the Yponomeutoidea.

Volume 3 (Yponomeutidae to Elachistidae)

 Editor: A. Maitland Emmet
 Associate Editors: D. S. Fletcher, B. H. Harley, J. R. Langmaid, G. S. Robinson, B. Skinner, P. A. Sokoloff and W. G. Tremewan
 Artists: Richard Lewington and Timothy Freed
 Hardback: 
 Paperback: 
 Published in: 1996 by Harley Books
 Introductory chapter: Invasions of Lepidoptera into the British Isles by D. J. L. Agassiz
 Covers Yponomeutidae, Epermeniidae, Schreckensteiniidae, Coleophoridae and Elachistidae.

Volume 4 Part 1 (Oecophoridae to Scythrididae, excluding Gelechiidae)

 Editor: A. Maitland Emmet and John R. Langmaid
 Associate Editors: K. P. Bland, D. S. Fletcher, B. H. Harley, G. S. Robinson, B. Skinner and W. G. Tremewan
 Artists: Richard Lewington and Michael J. Roberts
 Hardback: 
 Paperback: 
 Published in: 2002 by Harley Books
 Publisher's Foreword: A Tribute to Maitland Emmet
 Introductory chapter: The Ecology and Evolution of Lepidopteran Defences against Bats by J. Rydell and M. R. Young
 Covers Batrachedridae, Oecophoridae, Ethmiidae, Autostichidae, Blastobasidae, Agonoxenidae, Momphidae, Cosmopterigidae and Scythrididae

Volume 4 Part 2 (Gelechiidae)

 Editor: A. Maitland Emmet and John R. Langmaid
 Associate Editors: K. P. Bland, D. S. Fletcher, B. H. Harley, G. S. Robinson, B. Skinner and W. G. Tremewan
 Artists: Richard Lewington and Michael J. Roberts
 Hardback: 
 Paperback: 
 Published in: 2002 by Harley Books
 No introductory chapter
 Covers Gelechiidae

Volume 5 Part 1 (Tortricidae Tortricinae & Chlidanotinae)
 Editor: Keith P. Bland
 Authors: E.F. Hancock(†) and K.P. Bland 
 Genitalia drawings: J. Razowski
 Hardback: 
 e-book:  
 Published: in 2014 by Brill
 No introductory chapter
 Covers Tortricidae: subfamilies Tortricinae & Chlidanotinae

Volume 5 Part 2 (Tortricidae Olethreutinae)
 Editor: Keith P. Bland
 Authors: E.F. Hancock(†) and K.P. Bland
 Genitalia drawings: J. Razowski
 Hardback: 
 e-book:  
 Published in 2014 by Brill
 No introductory chapter
 Covers Tortricidae: subfamily Olethreutinae

Volume 6 (Pyralidae and Pterophoridae)

Volume 6 has not yet been published

Volume 7 Part 1 (Hesperiidae to Nymphalidae)

This volume was also titled The Butterflies of Britain and Ireland

 Editor: A. Maitland Emmet and John Heath
 Associate Editors: D. S. Fletcher, E. C. Pelham-Clinton, G. S. Robinson, B. Skinner and W. G. Tremewan
 Artists: Richard Lewington and Timothy Freed
 Hardback: 
 Paperback: 
 Published in: 1990 by Harley Books
 Introductory chapters: 1) The vernacular names and early history of British butterflies by A. M. Emmet; 2) Re-establishment of insect populations, with special reference to butterflies by M. G. Morris and J. A. Thomas
 Covers Hesperiidae, Papilionidae, Pieridae, Lycaenidae, Nymphalidae

Volume 7 Part 2 (Lasiocampidae to Thyatiridae)

 Editor: A. Maitland Emmet and John Heath
 Associate Editors: D. S. Fletcher, B. H. Harley, E. C. Pelham-Clinton, G. S. Robinson, B. Skinner and W. G. Tremewan
 Artists: Richard Lewington and Timothy Freed
 Hardback: 
 Paperback: 
 Published in: 1992 by Harley Books
 Introductory chapters: 1) Classification of the Lepidoptera by M. J. Scoble; 2) Resting posture in the Lepidoptera by M. W. F. Tweedie and A. M. Emmet; 3) Chart showing the Life History and Habits of the British Lepidoptera by A. M. Emmet

Volume 8 (Geometridae) 

Volume 8 has not yet been published

Volume 9 (Sphingidae to Noctuidae - Noctuinae and Hadeninae)

 Editor: John Heath and A. Maitland Emmet
 Associate Editors: D. S. Fletcher, E. C. Pelham-Clinton and W. G. Tremewan
 Artists: Brian Hargreaves and Maureen Lane
 Hardback:  (Curwen Books)  (Harley Books)
 Paperback: 
 Published in: 1979 by Curwen Books and reprinted in 1983 by Harley Books
 Introductory chapter: Eversible Structures by M. C. Birch
 Covers Sphingidae, Notodontidae, Thaumetopoeidae, Lymantriidae, Arctiidae, Ctenuchidae, Nolidae and Noctuidae (subfamilies Noctuinae and Hadeninae).

Volume 10 (Noctuidae - Cuculliinae to Hypeninae, and Agaristidae)

 Editor: John Heath and A. Maitland Emmet
 Associate Editors: D. S. Fletcher, E. C. Pelham-Clinton and W. G. Tremewan
 Artists: Brian Hargreaves, Brenda Jarman and Maureen Lane
 Hardback: 
 Paperback: 
 Published in: 1983 by Harley Books
 Introductory chapter: The Incidence of Migrant Lepidoptera in the British Isles by R. F. Bretherton
 Covers Cuculliinae, Acronictinae, Amphipyrinae, Heliothinae, Acontiinae, Chloephorinae, Sarrothripinae, Pantheinae, Plusiinae, Catocalinae, Ophiderinae, Hypeninae and Agaristidae

Volume 11 (Larvae)

Volume 11 has not yet been published

See also

 Differences between butterflies and moths
 Lepidoptera
 Taxonomy of the Lepidoptera

https://www.britishwildlife.com/contributor/nick-greatorex-davies

External links

 Apollo Books
 Brill Publishers

Books on Lepidoptera
Series of books